Santa Anzo is a Ugandan model, fashionista, fashion designer and businesswoman, who is the founder, chief fashion designer and managing director of Arapapa Fashion House, based in Kampala, Uganda's capital city. She is also the founder and President of Uganda International Fashion Week, an annual fashion exhibition.

Background and education 
Santa Anzo was born in Uganda, circa 1975. Her parents trace their ancestry to Moyo District, in the West Nile sub-region of Uganda.

She attended Old Kampala Primary School, before transferring to Bat Valley Primary School, where she obtained her Primary School Leaving Certificate. For her O-Level studies, she went to Madhvani College, in Wairaka, Jinja District. She studied at Progressive Secondary School, in Bweyogerere, Wakiso District, where she completed her A-level studies and obtained her High School Diploma. She then enrolled into Dolphins Fashion School, in Kampala, where she graduated with a Diploma in Fashion Design.

Career
In 1995, Ms Anzo was hired as waitress at Kampala Casino. She was also hired as a model at the same establishment and she modeled when not waitressing. In 1999, she met Sylvia Owori and together, they started Ziper Models, with Anzo managing the business while Owori managed the talent. Anzo served as sales person, model trainer, and fashion model. She managed the finances, and choreographed fashion shows. This relationship lasted 16 months, before Anzo left Ziper Models.

In 2001 Anzo left Ziper Models and started Arapapa. Arapapa means butterfly in her native Madi language. Two years later, she launched the Uganda International Fashion Week.

She has showcased her designs at multiple fashion festivals including Fashion for Peace initiative, Kenya Fashion Week, Mozambique Fashion Week, Swahili Fashion Week in Dar-es-Salaam, Tanzania, Africa Fashion Exchange, in Durban, South Africa, among others.

Awards and honors

 2nd position for the East African Designer of the year award at Swahili Fashion Week, December 2012, in Nairobi, Kenya.
 Speaker at the first ever Fashionprenuer Summit held by Abryanz Style & Fashion Awards (ASFAs), October 2018, in Kampala, Uganda.
 1st Prize Presidential Transformers Appreciation Award, December 2016, in Kampala, Uganda.
 Pioneer Ground Breaking Awards by Uganda Women Entrepreneur's Association, ICON & the International Labour Organization.
 Showcased at Africa Fashion Exchange 2018 in Durban, South Africa.  
 Lifetime Fashion Icon Achievement Award 2015.
 In 2014, the President of the United Nations Security Council, recognized Santa Anzo as one of 87 women that have scaled heights in Uganda, she is applauded for an invaluable role in pioneering African fashion & modelling careers in Uganda.

See also
 Anita Beryl
 Patricia Akello

References

External links
 Santa Anzo: Untold story

1975 births
Ugandan fashion designers
Living people
21st-century Ugandan businesswomen
21st-century Ugandan businesspeople
People from Moyo District
People from Northern Region, Uganda
Ugandan women fashion designers